Homonoia ( (Ancient Greek: Ὁμόνοια), in ancient Greek religion, was a minor goddess of concord, unanimity, and oneness of mind. Her opposite number was Eris (Strife).

Mythology 
Homonoia was believed to be the daughter of Soter, the saviour daimon, and Praxidike, the goddess of judicial punishment and vengeance. Her siblings were Arete (a goddess personifying virtue) and Ktesios, minor god of household. Arete and Homonoia were referred to as the Praxidikai, taking this name after their mother. As such Homonoia was probably closely identified with the Theban Goddess-Queen Harmonia.Praxidike (Exacter of Justice): A deity whose head alone is venerated. Mnaseas in his treatise On Europe says that Soter (Saviour) and his sister Praxidike (Exacter of Justice) had a son Ctesius (Household) and daughters Homonoia (Concord) and Arete (Virtue), who were called Praxidikai (Exacters of Penalties) after their mother.

See also

Homonoia the concept of order and unity, being of one mind together.
Harmonia is the goddess of harmony and concord

Notes

References 

 Suida, Suda Encyclopedia translated by Ross Scaife, David Whitehead, William Hutton, Catharine Roth, Jennifer Benedict, Gregory Hays, Malcolm Heath Sean M. Redmond, Nicholas Fincher, Patrick Rourke, Elizabeth Vandiver, Raphael Finkel, Frederick Williams, Carl Widstrand, Robert Dyer, Joseph L. Rife, Oliver Phillips and many others. Online version at the Topos Text Project.

Justice goddesses
Greek goddesses
Personifications in Greek mythology
Religion in ancient Boeotia